The Burrington Covered Bridge is a historic queenpost truss covered bridge in Lyndon, Vermont.  Built in the 19th century, it is one of five covered bridges in Lyndon.  It formerly carried Burrington Bridge Road across the Passumpsic River; it has been bypassed by a modern bridge.  It was listed on the National Register of Historic Places in 1974.

Description and history
The Burrington Covered Bridge is in a rural area northeast of downtown Lyndon, just south of Vermont Route 114 and west of Burrington Bridge Road. VT 114 parallels the Passumpsic River's north bank, and Burrington Bridge Road spans the river just upstream from the covered bridge. It rests on abutments of either stone faced in concrete or rebuilt out of concrete. The bridge is covered by a gabled roof with wide eaves, and has vertical board siding rising about halfway up its sides. The trusses include iron rods running from the peaks of the diagonal bracing down to the truss's bottom chord. The bridge decking is wooden planking. The portals project beyond the ends of the trusses, and are faced in vertical board siding. The portal openings have diagonal corners.

The bridge is one of five surviving 19th-century covered bridges in Lyndon.  All exhibit similar features: wide eaves, shortened siding, and projecting portals.  This bridge was used until 1965, when the new bridge was built upstream.

See also

 
 
 
 
 List of covered bridges in Vermont
 National Register of Historic Places listings in Caledonia County, Vermont
 List of bridges on the National Register of Historic Places in Vermont

References

Covered bridges on the National Register of Historic Places in Vermont
Buildings and structures in Lyndon, Vermont
Queen post truss bridges in the United States
Covered bridges in Caledonia County, Vermont
National Register of Historic Places in Caledonia County, Vermont
Wooden bridges in Vermont
Road bridges in Vermont